The 2021–22 season was the 123rd season in the history of Athletic Bilbao and the club's 91st consecutive season in the top flight of  Spanish football. In addition to the domestic league, Athletic Bilbao participated in this season's editions of the Copa del Rey and the Supercopa de España.

The first match of 2022 away to Osasuna was the 4,000th competitive fixture in the club's history (previous such milestones occurring in 1954, 1979 and 2001).

Players

First-team squad

Reserve team

Out on loan

Transfers

In

Out

Pre-season and friendlies

Competitions

Overall record

La Liga

League table

Results summary

Results by round

Matches
The league fixtures were announced on 30 June 2021.

Copa del Rey

Supercopa de España

Statistics

Appearances and goals
''Last updated on 22 May 2022.

|-
! colspan=14 style=background:#dcdcdc; text-align:center|Goalkeepers

|-
! colspan=14 style=background:#dcdcdc; text-align:center|Defenders

|-
! colspan=14 style=background:#dcdcdc; text-align:center|Midfielders

|-
! colspan=14 style=background:#dcdcdc; text-align:center|Forwards

|-
! colspan=14 style=background:#dcdcdc; text-align:center|Players who have made an appearance this season but have left the club

|}

Goalscorers

Notes

References

External links

Athletic Bilbao seasons
Athletic Bilbao